Phenylpiracetam hydrazide, also known as fonturacetam hydrazide, is a racetam that is a derivative of phenylpiracetam in which the amide group is replaced with a hydrazide group.  It was first reported by a Russian research group in 1980 as part of a series of chemical compounds investigated as anticonvulsants.  In an electroshock test it was found to have an ED50 of 310 mg/kg.

Sale on the internet 
All piracetam derivatives are not permitted to be sold as dietary supplements in the United States. However, because they lack scheduling, piracetam derivatives like phenylpiracetam hydrazide are sold over the clear net accompanied by indications stating that the compound is "not for human consumption".

See also
 Piracetam

References

Acetamides
Designer drugs
Hydrazides
Racetams
Anticonvulsants